Des haricots partout, written and drawn by Fournier, is the twenty-ninth album of the Spirou et Fantasio series, and the author's ninth and final contribution to the series. The story was serialised in Spirou magazine before it was released as a hardcover album in 1980.

Story
In Beans Everywhere, the attack on the bridge of Pagor Tevat fails, fortunately. Fantasio is therefore able to inspect Kuor-Lamb and collect information on the way that the harvests of Kodo function. Spirou manages to contact with him thanks to the pigeon of Prabang;  the rebels attempt to remove Spirou from the scene. United at last, Fantasio and Spirou develop a plan to overthrow the dictator.
Benefiting from the departure of Matteo, the rebels make leave Spirou the country;  this brings the Count de Champignac back in line with their cause. With the assistance of the WHO, where the Count has relations, they finally manage to unseat the dictator, who then flees the country.

References

 Fournier publications in Spirou BDoubliées

External links
Spirou official site album index 

Haricots partout, Des
Works originally published in Spirou (magazine)
Literature first published in serial form
1980 books
1980 in comics
Comics set in India
Comics set in Myanmar
Comics set in Asia